Count Johan Ludvig Carl Christian Tido of Holstein-Lederborg  (10 June 1839 – 1 March 1912), was a Danish politician  who was Minister of State of Denmark. He was Council President of Denmark for two months, from 16 August to 28 October 1909. He also served as Defence Minister of Denmark from 18 October to 28 October 1909.

Biography
Holstein was the son of Count Christian Edzard Moritz of Holstein-Lederborg (1809-1895) and his wife, Countess Caroline Louise Lefeubre de Marpalu (1810-1903). He was a descendant of  Danish Minister of state Count Johan Ludvig of Holstein-Ledreborg (1694–1763). He became a student from Roskilde Cathedral School in 1859 and became a  Cand.polit. from the University of Copenhagen in 1866. He took over the Ledreborg estate after his father's death in 1895. He rebuilt the chapel at Ledreborg and also had the buildings and the garden restored.

Prime Minister
Following the lack of a majority in the 1909 Folketing election, Klaus Berntsen suggested to Frederick VIII that Holstein may be able to gain the support of the three major liberal parties. The three Liberal groups settled on him as a prime minister, creating the first coalition after the establishment of the parliamentary system in Denmark. As prime minister, he formed a liberal cabinet with Jens Christian Christensen as defence minister, Niels Neergaard as finance minister, and Klaus Berntsen as minister of justice, and managed to form a compromise in the question of defence that satisfied the liberal parties, while still being acceptable to Højre.

As one of the few members of the Venstre Reform Party, the Danish Liberal party belonging to the nobility, Holstein was isolated by his colleagues and at the same time took a special position within Venstre. He was considered an outstanding and varied speaker and as one of "the five leaders of Venstre" but already 1890 he gave up his political life devoting himself to his life as a squire on Zealand.
Around two months into Holstein's term, conservative members of the Folketing called for a vote of no confidence in him, which failed. Shortly after, the Radical Democrats called for a vote of no confidence for his cabinet. This vote succeeded, marking the first time that a Danish cabinet was ousted by a vote of no confidence from the Folketing. He called upon the Radical Democrats to form a new cabinet because they instigated the vote to oust the old cabinet, and proceeded to resign.

Personal life
In 1867 he married Ingeborg Henriette de Løvenørn (1842-1915). Holstein converted to Catholicism that same year which made him Denmark's first and, so far, only Roman Catholic Prime Minister.

References

1839 births
1912 deaths
People from Ludwigsburg (district)
People from the Kingdom of Württemberg
Danish Roman Catholics
Prime Ministers of Denmark
Danish Defence Ministers
Members of the Folketing
20th-century Danish politicians
University of Copenhagen alumni